Minuscule 242 (in the Gregory-Aland numbering), δ 206 (Soden), is a Greek minuscule manuscript of the New Testament, on parchment. Palaeographically it has been assigned to the 12th century.

Description 

The codex contains entire of the New Testament with Book of Psalms, on 409 parchment leaves – 510 with Psalms – (size ). The text is written in one column per page, 24 lines per page. The order of books: Gospels, Acts, Catholic epistles, Pauline epistles, Apocalypse, and Psalms.

It contains Prolegomena, a division according to the Ammonian Sections, the Eusebian Canon tables before each Gospel, Synaxarion, Menologion, the Euthalian Apparatus and pictures.

Text 

In Acts 1:10.11 the manuscript omits phrase εἰς τὸν οὐρανόν together with the manuscripts: Codex Bezae, 33c, 326*.

Kurt Aland the Greek text of the codex did not place in any Category.
It was not examined by the Claremont Profile Method.

History 

Formerly the manuscript was held at Athos peninsula. It was brought to Moscow, by the monk Arsenius, on the suggestion of the Patriarch Nikon, in the reign of Alexei Mikhailovich Romanov (1645-1676). The manuscript was collated by C. F. Matthaei.
It was examined by Kurt Treu in 1958.

The manuscript is currently housed at the State Historical Museum (V. 25, S. 407) at Moscow.

See also 

 List of New Testament minuscules
 Biblical manuscript
 Textual criticism

References

Further reading 

 C. F. Matthei, Novum Testamentum Graece et Latine, (Riga, 1782-1788). (as l)
 Herman C. Hoskier, Concernig the Text of the Apocalypse (London, 1929), vol. 1, pp. 138-141.
 Kurt Treu, Die Griechischen Handschriften des Neuen Testaments in der UdSSR; eine systematische Auswertung des Texthandschriften in Leningrad, Moskau, Kiev, Odessa, Tbilisi und Erevan, T & U 90 (Berlin, 1966), pp. 258-260.

External links 
 W.J. Elliott, An Examination of von Soden's Ibl Group of Manuscript s (Acts & Catholic Epistles only), Birmingham University 1974, p. 12-13.

Greek New Testament minuscules
12th-century biblical manuscripts
Septuagint manuscripts